Lupinus saxosus is a species of lupine known by the common name rock lupine. It is native to the Pacific Northwest and Great Basin of the United States, where it grows in sagebrush and other habitat. This is a perennial herb growing erect 20 to 30 centimeters tall. Each palmate leaf is made up of 7 to 13 hairy leaflets 1 to 4 centimeters long. The inflorescence is a dense raceme of many flowers sometimes arranged in whorls. The flower is between 1 and 2 centimeters long and blue in color with a yellowish or violet patch on its banner. The fruit is a shaggy-haired legume pod up to 4 centimeters in length.

External links
Jepson Manual Treatment

saxosus
Flora of the Western United States
Flora without expected TNC conservation status